The World Group was the highest level of Federation Cup women's team tennis competition in 1992. Thirty-two nations competed in a five-round knockout competition from 13–19 July. Spain was the defending champion, but Germany defeated them in the final to claim their second title and first since the reunification.

Participating Teams

Draw

First round

Spain vs. Belgium

Canada vs. South Africa

Argentina vs. Mexico

Japan vs. Indonesia

Austria vs. Romania

Bulgaria vs. Australia

South Korea vs. Italy

Hungary vs. Czechoslovakia

Germany vs. New Zealand

Paraguay vs. Netherlands

Poland vs. Israel

Sweden vs. Switzerland

CIS vs. Finland

France vs. China

Denmark vs. Chile

Great Britain vs. United States

Second round

Spain vs. Canada

Argentina vs. Japan

Austria vs. Australia

South Korea vs. Czechoslovakia

Germany vs. Netherlands

Poland vs. Sweden

CIS vs. France

Denmark vs. United States

Quarterfinals

Spain vs. Argentina

Australia vs. Czechoslovakia

Germany vs. Poland

France vs. United States

Semifinals

Spain vs. Australia

Germany vs. United States

Final

Spain vs. Germany

References

External links
 Fed Cup website

World Group
Tennis tournaments in Germany
Sports competitions in Frankfurt
Fed Cup